Troy Johnson (born 26 July 1977) is a former Australian rules footballer who played with the Brisbane Bears in the Australian Football League (AFL).

Johnson, a Fremantle Hawks junior, was a Western Australian representative in the AFL Under 18 Championships.

He was drafted by Brisbane from South Fremantle and made his AFL debut in the opening round of the 1996 season, against Footscray. The Bears won the game by 87 points, with Johnson contributing four disposals. He kept his spot in the team for the next round, which was against the West Coast Eagles back in his home state, but he didn't register a possession.

De-listed for disciplinary reasons, Johnson returned to South Fremantle and took part in their 1997 finals campaign. He nominated for the 1997 AFL Draft and was chosen by Fremantle with pick 32, but would never play a senior game for them.

References

1977 births
Australian rules footballers from Western Australia
Brisbane Bears players
South Fremantle Football Club players
Living people